Simply Kushboo is an Indian Tamil-language talk show that aired on Zee Tamizh. The show was launched on 22 August 2015 and aired weekly on every Saturday 8:00PM IST. The show is hosted by Kushboo.

The show will take fans up, close and personal to their favourite celebrities as Kushboo chats with them on their journeys via personal quizzes, career maps, their favourites in film industry, some dark secrets, hidden talents and not to forget, impromptu tests of their acting and dancing skills.

Guests included
Epi 01: Jayam Ravi
Epi 02: Kamal Haasan
Epi 03: Karthi 
Epi 04: Arvind Swamy 
Epi 05: Sivakarthikeyan 
Epi 06: G. V. Prakash Kumar
Epi 07 & 08: Silambarasan
 Epi 09: Andrea Jeremiah
 Epi 10: Sathish 
 Epi 11: Vijay Sethupathi
 Epi 12: Siddharth
 Epi 13: Meena
 Epi 14: Shruti Haasan
 Epi 15: R. Parthiepan
 Epi 16: Vaibhav Reddy
Epi 17: S.P. Balasubrahmanyam
Epi 18: Hiphop Tamizha
Epi 19: Hansika Motwani
Epi 20: Ravichandran Ashwin
Epi 21: Sundar C.
Epi 22: R. Madhavan
Epi 23: Keerthy Suresh
Epi 24: K.S. Ravikumar
Epi 25: Nandita Swetha
Epi 26: Prashanth

References

External links
 
 Simply Kushboo on ZEE5

Zee Tamil original programming
2015 Tamil-language television series debuts
Tamil-language talk shows
Tamil-language television shows
2016 Tamil-language television series endings
Television shows set in Tamil Nadu